Delfs is a surname. Notable people with the surname include:

Andreas Delfs (born 1959), German conductor
Flemming Delfs (born 1951), Danish badminton player
Len Delfs (1920–1973), Australian rules footballer

See also
Delf (disambiguation)